William J. McCoy  (August 14, 1942 – November 12, 2019) was an American farmer and Democratic politician from Rienzi, Mississippi. He was the Speaker of the House of Representatives of the State of Mississippi.

Background 
McCoy was born August 14, 1942 in Booneville, attended Northeast Mississippi Junior College, and graduated from Mississippi State University. He has worked as a vocational agriculture teacher and as a loan officer for the Farmers Home Administration, as well as a school auditor for the Mississippi State Department of Audit. He also farmed.

House of Representatives 
McCoy became a member of the House in 1980, and was elected Speaker in 2004. In 2008, he faced (and beat) a challenge by conservative fellow Democrat, later Republican Jeff Smith of Columbus, who was supported by the Republicans in the House and by Republican governor Haley Barbour.

On May 25, 2011, McCoy announced that he would not seek re-election to the State House.

Personal life 
McCoy married Edith Leatherwood. He was a Baptist, Freemason, and a member of the Farm Bureau. He served as a member of the Board of Trustees of Northeast Mississippi Community College. He died on November 12, 2019 at the North Mississippi Medical Center in Tupelo, Mississippi. He was 77 years old.

Sources 
Home page
Project VoteSmart: "Representative William J. 'Billy' McCoy (MS)"

References 

1942 births
2019 deaths
Farmers from Mississippi
Baptists from Mississippi
Mississippi State University alumni
People from Alcorn County, Mississippi
People from Booneville, Mississippi
Speakers of the Mississippi House of Representatives
Democratic Party members of the Mississippi House of Representatives
20th-century American politicians
21st-century American politicians
20th-century Baptists